The Mary-Kate and Ashley games are a series of video games released between 1999 and 2002 that feature Mary-Kate and Ashley Olsen in various scenarios such as trying to solve crimes, caring for horses, or freeing a shopping mall from a curse. The games were released by Acclaim Entertainment on several different game systems such as the Game Boy Color and PlayStation 1 and 2 consoles.

In 2004, Mary-Kate and Ashley filed a lawsuit against Acclaim Entertainment over claims that the company had not paid them a settlement of about $178,000, which was from an earlier case concerning royalties that had not been paid towards the girls.

Video games
The New Adventures of Mary-Kate & Ashley (December 16, 1999Game Boy Color) - reskinned version of Maya the Bee and Her Friends, which itself was a reskin of an unreleased South Park game.
Mary-Kate and Ashley: Dance Party of the Century (1999, PC)
Mary-Kate and Ashley: Get A Clue  (2000, Game Boy Color)
Mary-Kate and Ashley: Magical Mystery Mall (2000, PlayStation)
Mary-Kate and Ashley: Pocket Planner (2000, Game Boy Color)
Mary-Kate and Ashley: Winners Circle (2001, PlayStation, Game Boy Color)
Mary-Kate and Ashley: Crush Course (2001, PlayStation, PC, Game Boy Color)
Mary-Kate and Ashley: Girls' Night Out (2002, Game Boy Advance)
Mary-Kate and Ashley: Sweet 16 – Licensed to Drive (2002, Game Boy Advance, GameCube, PlayStation 2)

Reception
Reception for the games have been heavily negative, with the 1999 Game Boy Color game The New Adventures of Mary-Kate & Ashley receiving a score of 6/10 from IGN while the 2000 Magical Mystery Mall received one of 4/10. In contrast, the Telegraph praised the Pocket Planner as being "quite clever".

Mary-Kate and Ashley: Magical Mystery Mall sold 286,000 copies.

References

Acclaim Entertainment games
Video games
GameCube games
Party video games
PlayStation 2 games
Game Boy Advance games
Game Boy Color games
Lists of video games by franchise
Video games based on real people
Video games featuring female protagonists
Video games developed in the United States